Hong Kong Confidential is a 1958 American film noir crime film directed by Edward L. Cahn starring Gene Barry, Beverly Tyler and Allison Hayes.

Plot
Agent Casey Reed is tasked to find a missing prince (played by an un-credited Michael Barry) of the small Arab nation Thamen who was kidnapped by Communists who want to prevent him from signing an agreement that would allow the United States build a missile base there. Reed masquerades as a singer in a nightclub, but he is captured by the Communists, who plan to kill the two of them in order to blame the kidnapping on the Americans.

Cast
 Gene Barry as Agent Casey Reed
 Beverly Tyler as Fay Wells
 Allison Hayes as Elena Martine
 Ed Kemmer as Frank Paige
 Michael Pate as John Blanchard
 Rico Alaniz as Fernando
 Philip Ahn as Tan Chung
 King Calder as Dan Young
 Noel Drayton as Owen Howard

Reception
Leonard Maltin described it as a "Harmless B film about Anglo-American agents rescuing a kidnapped Arabian prince.", while giving it 2.5 out of 4 stars.

References

External links

1958 films
Film noir
1958 crime drama films
American black-and-white films
American crime drama films
Cold War spy films
1950s English-language films
Films about kidnapping
Films about communism
Films directed by Edward L. Cahn
Films scored by Emil Newman
Films shot in Los Angeles
Films set in Macau
United Artists films
1950s American films